Allium baluchistanicum is a plant species endemic to the Baluchistan region in Pakistan.

Allium baluchistanicum has cylindrical bulbs about 9 mm long. Scape is up to 50 cm tall. Flowers are white with reddish midveins.

References

baluchistanicum
Onions
Flora of Pakistan
Plants described in 1963